Ayao Komatsu (born 28 January 1976) is a Japanese Formula One engineer. He is currently the trackside engineering director at the Haas Formula One team.

Career
Komatsu began his career in motorsport in 2003 as a tyre engineer for the British American Racing, and stuck with the Brackley team for two seasons. In 2006 he moved to Renault to work as a performance engineer, starting out on the test team before being promoted to the race team working with drivers such as Nelson Piquet Jr., Romain Grosjean and Vitaly Petrov.

After Mark Slade departed at the commencement of the 2011 season he was promoted to Petrov's race engineer, working with the Russian for one year before partnering up with the returning Grosjean for 2012. The Frenchmen and Komatsu formed a close bond, scoring nine podium finishes and even fought for race wins at the end of 2013. After a disappointing 2014, Komatsu was promoted to chief race engineer at Lotus, helping Grosjean and the Enstone team score a podium at the 2015 Belgian Grand Prix. When Grosjean left for the fledging Haas F1 Team, Komatsu followed him becoming trackside engineering director for the American outfit in 2016. and go-between for Haas Komatsu has remained with the team ever since where he is responsible for trackside car performance and the coordination of the race engineering team.

References

1976 births
Living people
Formula One engineers